Mehdi Safaei (Persian: مهدی صفایی, was born March 23, 1977, in Kermanshah) is an Iranian athlete, investor, lecturer and entrepreneur. He is owner of Concept Industrial Group and the national sample entrepreneur.

Early life 
Mehdi Safai was born on March 23, 1977, in Kermanshah city.

Professional career 
He is currently a business lecturer and  the founder and manager of Concept Holding including nine sub-sets. In 1997, he qualified for the Italian World Cup as the coach of the Iranian Top Karate National Team. He was also a specialized coach of the UAE Police and the head coach of the Iranian national kickboxing team, as well as a bodybuilding coach of the Iranian National Football Team.

Legacy 
His life has been documented several times. His life was discussed in an episode of the documentary series "One of Us". Another documentary which separately showed the life of Pouran Derakhshandeh and  Mehdi Safaei, screened at the Cinema Verite Festival.

References

External links 
 documentary series "One of Us" in doctv
 
 

1977 births
Living people
People from Kermanshah
Motivational speakers
Academic staff of the University of Tehran
Iranian business executives
Iranian company founders
Iranian businesspeople